Calamaria gervaisii, commonly known as Gervais' worm snake,  is a species of relatively small-sized burrowing or fossorial snake in the family Colubridae. This Snake feed on Earthworms and can grow maximum of 1FT or 30CM in length

Etymology
The specific name, gervaisii, is in honor of French zoologist Paul Gervais.

Geographic range
Calamaria gervaisii is endemic to the Philippine Islands. Its range includes the islands of Basilan, Catanduanes, Cebu, Lubang, Luzon, Mindanao, Mindoro,  Negros, Panay, Polillo, and Tablas.

Habitat
It lives in forests and plantations, burrowing in the leaf litter and hiding under stones and fallen logs, or between the buttresses of trees.

Status
The IUCN has listed Calamaria gervaisii as being of "least concern" because it has a wide range, appears to be abundant with a stable population and seems to be tolerant of disturbance to its natural habitat. No particular threats to this species have been identified.

References

Further reading
Boulenger GA (1885). Catalogue of the Snakes in the British Museum (Natural History). Volume II., Containing the Conclusion of the Colubridæ Aglyphæ. London: Trustees of the British Museum (Natural History). (Taylor and Francis, printers). xi + 382 pp. + Plates I-XX. (Calamaria gervaisii, pp. 338–339).
Duméril A-M-C, Bibron G, Duméril A[-H-A] (1854). Erpétologie générale ou histoire naturelle complète des reptiles. Tome septième. Première partie. Comprenant l'histoire des serpents non venimeux [= General Herpetology or Complete Natural History of the Reptiles, Volume 7, Part 1, Containing the History of the Nonvenomous Snakes]. Paris: Roret. xvi + 780 pp. (Calamaria gervaisii, new species, pp. 76–78). (in French).
Jan [G] (1865). Iconographie générale des Ophidiens, Dixième livraison [= General Iconography of the Snakes, Issue 10]. (illustrated by F. Sordelli). Paris: Baillière. Index + Plates I-VI. (Calamaria gervaisii, Plate II, figure 1). (in French).

Colubrids
Reptiles described in 1854
Taxa named by André Marie Constant Duméril
Taxa named by Gabriel Bibron
Taxa named by Auguste Duméril
Reptiles of the Philippines
Calamaria
Taxobox binomials not recognized by IUCN